The City of Hervey Bay was a local government area located in the Wide Bay–Burnett region of Queensland, Australia, containing the urban centre of Hervey Bay as well as the northern half of Fraser Island.

History

The area now known as City of Hervey Bay first received local government with the Divisional Boards Act 1879, where on 11 November 1879, the Antigua (population 1636) and Burrum (population 1511) Divisions were created.

A later division, Howard, was split away from the Division of Isis in 1900.

With the passage of the Local Authorities Act 1902, the Antigua, Burrum and Howard Divisions became the Shires of Antigua, Burrum and Howard on 31 March 1903.

On 3 June 1905, the Shire of Degilbo, later renamed Biggenden, split away from the Shire of Burrum.

On 23 December 1905, the Shire of Burrum was renamed Shire of Pialba.

Reorganisation of the Maryborough area in 1917
On 17 February 1917, there was a reorganisation of local government in the Maryborough area. Five shires were abolished:
 Antigua
 Granville
 Howard
 Pialba
 Tinana
The resulting local government areas were:
 a recreated Shire of Burrum, comprising all of the Shires of Howard and Pialba and part of the Shire of Antigua and part of the City of Maryborough
 an altered Shire of Kilkivan, losing parts to the Shire of Tiaro and the Shire of Tinana but gaining part of the Shire of Tiaro and part of the Shire of Woocoo
 an altered City of Maryborough, losing a small part to the Shire of Burrum but gaining part of the Shire of Granville
 an altered Shire of Tiaro, losing part to Shire of Kilkivan, but gaining parts of the Shires of Granville, Kilkivan and Widgee
 an altered Shire of Tinana, gaining parts of the Shires of Granville, Kilkivan and Widgee
 an altered Shire of Widgee, losing part to Shire of Kilkivan, but gaining part of the Shire of Tiaro
 an enlarged Shire of Woocoo, losing part to the Shire of Kilkivan, but gaining parts of the Shires of Antigua and Howard

A coastal focus in the 1970s
By the 1920s the Hervey Bay area was rapidly expanding due to continuing growth in the primary industries such as sugar cane, citrus, pineapples, beef cattle and fishing, as well as investment in transport infrastructure. In the 1950s and 1960s, population and development increased, and the coastal settlements slowly merged into a single urban area.

On 20 December 1975, the Shire of Burrum was renamed the Shire of Hervey Bay with effect from the local government elections of 27 March 1976. With the new focus on the coastal region,  of its area, with an estimated population of 1,119, was annexed by the City of Maryborough, while  with an estimated population of 2,629 was annexed by the Shire of Woocoo.

In September 1977, the Shire of Hervey Bay became the Town of Hervey Bay, and on 18 February 1984 it became a City.

Amalgamations of 2008
On 15 March 2008, under the Local Government (Reform Implementation) Act 2007 passed by the Parliament of Queensland on 10 August 2007, Hervey Bay merged with the City of Maryborough, Shire of Woocoo and part of Tiaro to form the Fraser Coast Region.

Suburbs and localities
The City of Hervey Bay included the following settlements:

Urban Hervey Bay:
 Booral
 Bunya Creek
 Craignish
 Dundowran
 Dundowran Beach
 Eli Waters
 Kawungan
 Nikenbah
 Pialba
 Point Vernon
 Scarness
 Sunshine Acres
 Susan River
 Takura
 Toogoom
 Torquay
 Urangan
 Urraween
 Walligan
 Wondunna

Rural Hervey Bay:
 Beelbi Creek
 Burgowan
 Burrum
 Burrum Heads
 Burrum River
 Burrum Town
 Cherwell
 Dundathu
 Howard
 Pacific Haven
 River Heads
 Torbanlea
 Walliebum
|}

Population

Chairmen and mayors

Chairmen of Burrum Divisional Board
 1888: Mr Tooth (1888) 
 1898: Edward Bernard Cresset Corser

Chairmen of Shire of Burrum / Pialba
 1905: Hans Jacob Fevre
 1916: H. Hansen 
 1918: Henry Bashford
 1927: Edward James Stafford

Mayors of City of Hervey Bay
 Judy Rice (1985-1988)
 Fred Kleinschmidt (1988–1997)
 Bill Brennan (1997–2000)
 Ted Sorensen (2000–2008)

References

External links
 

Former local government areas of Queensland
Hervey Bay
2008 disestablishments in Australia
Populated places disestablished in 2008
Fraser Coast Region